The Wiederkehr GHW-1 Cu-Climber is an American, high-wing, single-seat glider that was designed by George H. Wiederkehr and first flown in 1968.

Design and development
The Cu-Climber is an original design and is of mixed construction, with the fuselage of fibreglass with foam bulkheads, forming a semi-monocoque structure. The wings are a fiberglass and balsa sandwich, with fibreglass skin, except aft of the spar on the under-surface where aircraft fabric covering is employed. The wing also features a large 12 inch (30 cm) X 6 inch (15 cm) box spar that is made from spruce, plywood and fiberglass, which is stressed to +9.6/-6.3 g. The wing employs a Pfenninger 14% airfoil.

The control surfaces include an all flying tail fitted with an anti-servo tab and full-span ailerons of very short chord that act as flaps when drooped for glidepath control. The landing gear is a fixed monowheel that is faired to reduce drag.

The aircraft's designation of GHW-1 indicates the designer's initials. Unusually the aircraft is registered with the Federal Aviation Administration simply as Amateur Built 68 glider. Only one example was ever constructed.

Operational history
In 1983 Soaring Magazine reported that the GHW-1 was being regularly flown and that the designer was constructing a new GHW-2. In May 2011 the GHW-1 was still registered to Wiederkehr. The GHW-2 was completed and in May 2011 was owned by Anthony C. Wiederkehr.

Specifications (GHW-1)

See also

References

1960s United States sailplanes
Homebuilt aircraft
Aircraft first flown in 1968